Presentation of Mary Academy, commonly abbreviated PMA was a private Roman Catholic co-ed high school, grades 9–12 in Methuen, Massachusetts.  It was located in the Roman Catholic Archdiocese of Boston. PMA's student body hailed from 31 local cities and towns, represented 3 New England states, and 4 countries.

History
The school was founded in 1958.  The Academy, located at 209 Lawrence St, is situated on a 22-acre campus formerly known as the Edward F. Searles Estate. In 2008, the school celebrated its 50th anniversary. In October 2016, the estate was opened up for public tours. There are other related schools in the region also operated by the Sisters of the Presentation, including the same-named Presentation of Mary Academy grammar school in Hudson, New Hampshire (which continues to operate).

October 2017 threat scare
On the afternoon of October 4, 2017, threatening messages were discovered written on a school wall by a student after school hours. This prompted a massive police response and a 1-hour delay of classes the following day, October 5th. Additionally, all students arriving to school on October 5th were required to walk through a metal detector and to have their bags scanned by a computerized program. Police presence remained active throughout the school day on October 5th and many extra safety measures were taken. By the afternoon of October 5th, the Methuen Police Chief as well as the Head of School had announced that there was no longer any imminent threat and that school would proceed as normal the following day.

In the late evening hours of October 5th, police reported that a student had confessed to writing the threatening messages on the school wall. Police also confirmed the following day, October 6th, that a juvenile felony charge would be filed against the student in question, who has not yet been identified by authorities.

2020 Closure
In October 2019, Presentation of Mary Academy announced that the school would close at the end of the 2020 school year. Financial concerns were the primary cause for this decision – enrollment at the school had significantly declined over the past several years and the number of students attending while unable to afford full tuition was increasing. As a private school that did not receive any state or federal tax dollars, all revenue was financed through donations, fundraisers, tuition, and the Sisters of the Presentation. In September, it had announced that the Sisters would leave the property, further adding to the financial stress of the school.

The final classes were conducted online beginning in March 2020 due to the coronavirus pandemic. The final graduating class graduated via a “rolling rally” under pandemic restrictions across the campus on May 30, 2020.

Notable alumni
Kayla Pacenka, '15, Emmy Award-Winning Illustrator and Animator.

Notes and references

External links 
Presentation of Mary Academy Official Website

Commonwealth Athletic Conference
Roman Catholic Archdiocese of Boston
Catholic secondary schools in Massachusetts
Schools in Essex County, Massachusetts
Educational institutions established in 1958
Buildings and structures in Methuen, Massachusetts
1958 establishments in Massachusetts